Serafima Bryusova Born Serafima Semyonovna Sidorova (31 December 1894 in Moscow - 1958 in Moscow) was the world's first female neurosurgeon.

Biography 
She graduated from the second Moscow Institute for Medicine in 1923. She started surgical residency in 1924 and in 1928 was invited by Nikolay Burdenko to work as a neurosurgical consultant in his newly founded clinic in Moscow.

She obtained her PhD in 1939 and became a professor in 1941. In 1951, she published the first Russian neurosurgical monograph "Brain angiography", making significant contributions the knowledge of the anatomy of the Circle of Willis. She also studied pain perception in the dura mater, traumatic brain injury, and intracranial pressure.

Personal life 
She was the wife of famous archeologist Alexander Bryusov, brother of the symbolist poet Valery Bryusov. They had a son named Boris.

References 

1894 births
1958 deaths
Soviet neurosurgeons